Kanchanaburi is a town municipality (thesaban mueang) in the west of Thailand and part of Kanchanaburi Province. In 2006 it had a population of 31,327. That number was reduced to 25,651 in 2017. The town covers tambons Ban Nuea and Ban Tai and parts of Pak Phraek and Tha Makham, all of Mueang Kanchanaburi District, and parts of tambon Tha Lo of Tha Muang District. Kanchanaburi lies 123 km west of Bangkok.

History
In the late-18th century, Kanchanaburi was established by King Rama I as a defensive outpost against possible Burmese attacks in what is now Lat Ya Sub-district. In 1833, the town was moved about 16  km to the southeast along the river to its present site during the reign of King Rama III.

From the Ayutthaya period to the Thonburi and Rattanakosin period, Kanchanaburi was an important outpost to defend against Burmese invasions. The old town was located at Tambon Lat Ya (Khao Chon Kai in the present). In 1831, King Rama III, moved the city to the southeast about 16 kilometers to set at the confluence of the Khwae Yai River and the Khwae Noi River, which is the location of the town today.

On March 25, 1935, a royal decree was issued for Ban Nuea Subdistrict and Ban Tai Subdistrict, which has an area of approximately 2.08 square kilometers.

Geography

Kanchanaburi, where the Khwae Noi and Khwae Yai Rivers converge into the Mae Klong River, spans the northern banks of the river and is a popular spot for travelers. Its location at the edge of a mountain range keeps it much cooler than the other provinces of central Thailand.

Economy
The city has two major commercial districts: the downtown area consists of a grid of several streets with office buildings, shop fronts, and a shopping mall; and the riverfront area businesses are mostly further west along River Kwai Road. Once a year a carnival comes to town and is set up in the area next to the bridge. At night there is a small pyrotechnics display that re-enacts the wartime bombing of the bridge.

The riverfront has skywalk, and next to it is Walking Street. The skywalk is a "12-metre high and 150 metre-long" glass walkway, owned by the local government; to access the skywalk, one must pay [on site] 60 baht to own a pair of plastic shoes.

Buddhism
Kanchanaburi is the birthplace of the Buddhist monk Phrabhavanaviriyakhun. Each grotto features a statue of the Buddha at a different stage of his life. It is the easiest access point to the nearby Tiger Temple (closed) and is also home to a Vipassana meditation center.

Death railway

In 1942 Kanchanaburi was under Japanese control. It was here that Asian forced labourers and Allied POWs, building the infamous Burma Railway, constructed a bridge, an event fictionalised in the films The Bridge on the River Kwai (1957), Return from the River Kwai (1989) and The Railway Man (2013). Almost half of the prisoners working on the project died from disease, maltreatment or accidents. There were four POW camps in or near the city, including Tamarkan which was used as a work camp to construct the bridge. After the completion of the railway line, most prisoners were concentrated in the Kanchanaburi area, and often sent on to Japan or French Indo-China.

At Kanchanaburi, there is a memorial and two museums to commemorate the dead. In March 2003, the Thailand–Burma Railway Centre opened and the JEATH (Japanese-English-American-Australian-Thai-Holland) War Museum dedicated to the bridge and the Death Railway. The city is also home to the Kanchanaburi War Cemetery.

Climate 
Kanchanaburi has a tropical savanna climate (Köppen climate classification Aw). Winters are dry and very warm. The monsoon season runs from May through October, with heavy rain and somewhat cooler temperatures during the day, although nights remain warm.

See also
 Mueang Kanchanaburi District
 Beata Mundi Regina
 Kanchanaburi Province
 Kanchanaburi Rajabhat University
 Visuttharangsi School, the provincial secondary school of Kanchanaburi
 Siam–Burma Death Railway (film) (film)
 Kanchanaburi War Cemetery

References

External links

 
Populated places in Kanchanaburi province
Cities and towns in Thailand